Zinc finger protein 598 (ZNF598) is a protein that in humans is encoded by the ZNF598 gene.

Function 
Zinc-finger proteins bind nucleic acids and play important roles in various cellular functions, including cell proliferation, differentiation, and apoptosis. This protein and Grb10-interacting GYF protein 2 have been identified as a components of the mammalian 4EHP (m4EHP) complex. The complex is thought to function as a translation repressor in embryonic development. ZNF598 and its yeast homologue Hel2 are ubiquitin ligases that ubiquitinate the 40S ribosomal subunit during ribosome-associated protein quality control.

References